The 1970 European Rowing Championships were rowing championships held on Lake Öreg in Tata, Hungary. There were five competitions for women only (W1x, W2x, W4x+, W4+, W8+); the events for men were contested two weeks later at the 1970 World Rowing Championships in St. Catharines, Canada, instead. As World Rowing Championships were still held at four-year intervals at the time, the European Rowing Championships were open to nations outside of Europe and had become to be regarded as quasi-world championships.

The championships were held from 20 to 23 August 1970 and that saw entries from 17 nations. The Soviet Union, the host Hungary, Poland, Czechoslovakia, Romania, the Netherlands and East Germany were the countries that contested all five boat classes. In total, 56 boats were nominated. The competition distance was 1000 metres.

Medal summary – women's events
East Germany was the most successful country with three gold medals (single sculls, double sculls, and eight), with one gold to the Soviet Union (coxed four) and Romania (coxed quad scull) each.

Medals table

References

European Rowing Championships
European Rowing Championships
Rowing
Rowing
Rowing